Frederick Carroll Brewster (May 15, 1825December 30, 1898) was a prominent Philadelphia lawyer and judge, who served as state Attorney General.  He wrote commentaries on law.

Life and career
Brewster was born the son of Francis Enoch Brewster (a descendant of William Brewster, of the Mayflower) and his mistress, Isabella Anderson.  The father mostly ignored his wife and legitimate children, who would become lawyer Benjamin H. Brewster and author Anne Hampton Brewster, and the half-siblings would grow up mutually estranged.

Brewster was graduated from the University of Pennsylvania in 1841, he studied law with his father, and was admitted to the bar in 1844.

In 1850, Brewster married Emma Barton, who descended from William Rittenhouse on both sides of her family and from Jonathan Dickinson Sergeant through her mother.  His father's death left his estate to Brewster and his full brother, leaving out the legitimate children entirely.  Benjamin negotiated a split of the estate without consulting Anne, she sued, and the matter would not be settled for several years.

In 1862, Brewster was elected City Solicitor.  In 1866, he was elected Judge of the Court of Common Pleas.  In 1867, his half-brother Benjamin was appointed state Attorney General.  Benjamin proved to be too critical, and Governor Geary insultingly replaced him as Attorney General with F. Carroll, and then reappointed F. Carroll for a full term of his own.

He died in 1898, and his remains were buried in the St. James the Less cemetery, Philadelphia.

Bibliography

Legal works

Non-legal works

References

Works cited
 
 
 
 
 
 

1825 births
1898 deaths
Pennsylvania Attorneys General
Pennsylvania lawyers
Pennsylvania Republicans
University of Pennsylvania alumni
19th-century American lawyers
19th-century American politicians